Dom-Ino House is an open floor plan modular structure designed by  the pioneering architect Le Corbusier in 1914–1915. This design became the foundation for most of his architecture for the next ten years.

History
It was a prototype as the physical platform for the mass production of housing. The name is a pun that combines an allusion to domus (Latin for house) and the pieces of the game of dominoes,  because the floor plan resembled the game and because the units could be aligned in a series like dominoes, to make row houses of different patterns.

Design

This model proposed an open floor plan consisting of concrete slabs supported by a minimal number of thin, reinforced concrete columns around the edges, with a stairway providing access to each level on one side of the floor plan.  The frame was to be completely independent of the floor plans of the houses thus giving freedom to design the interior configuration. The model eliminated load-bearing walls and the supporting beams for the ceiling.

See also
Glass House 
Farnsworth House

References

Le Corbusier
Modernist architecture